Hannah Lamdan (born 5 January 1905, died 10 April 1995) was an Israeli politician who served as a member of the Knesset for several left-wing parties between 1949 and 1965.

Biography
Hannah Lerner (later Lamdan) was born in Shiryvtsi, Khotinsky Uyezd, Bessarabia Governorate, Russian Empire (today Ukraine). She attended a Hebrew language primary school and a Russian language high school before immigrating to Mandatory Palestine in 1926. She was a member of Hashomer Hatzair youth movement.

Lamdan died in Holon on 10 April 1995.

Political career
She joined the Ahdut HaAvoda political party and was an activist for the Histadrut trade union. After her election to the Tel Aviv workers council, she headed the Women Workers department in 1937- 1940. In 1944-1949, she was a member of the Women Workers Council's secretariat.

In 1948, Lamdan joined Mapam. In 1949, she was elected to Israel's First Knesset. She was re-elected in 1951, but on 20 January 1953, she and David Livschitz broke away from the party to form the Faction independent of Ahdut HaAvoda (several other Mapam MKs had broken away to re-establish Ahdut HaAvoda). On 13 January 1954 Lamdan and Livschitz joined Mapai.

She lost her seat in the 1955 elections, but returned to the Knesset on 31 July 1957 as a replacement for Ehud Avriel, who had resigned as an MK to become an ambassador. She retained her seat in the 1959 elections, but lost it again in 1961. However, she returned again as a replacement for the deceased Giora Yoseftal on 23 August 1962.

On 14 July 1965 she was amongst the eight MKs to leave Mapai, led by David Ben-Gurion, to establish Rafi. She lost her seat in the elections later that year.

References

External links

1905 births
1995 deaths
People from Chernivtsi Oblast
People from Khotinsky Uyezd
Ukrainian Jews
Bessarabian Jews
Romanian emigrants to Mandatory Palestine
Jews in Mandatory Palestine
Israeli people of Ukrainian-Jewish descent
Hashomer Hatzair members
Mapam politicians
Ahdut HaAvoda politicians
Faction independent of Ahdut HaAvoda politicians
Mapai politicians
Rafi (political party) politicians
Members of the 1st Knesset (1949–1951)
Members of the 2nd Knesset (1951–1955)
Members of the 3rd Knesset (1955–1959)
Members of the 4th Knesset (1959–1961)
Members of the 5th Knesset (1961–1965)
Women members of the Knesset
Jewish socialists
Israeli trade unionists
20th-century Israeli women politicians